Mario Veit (born 22 December 1973) is a German former professional boxer. He is a former European super middleweight champion and multiple time world title challenger.

Professional career
Veit went undefeated in his first 30 fights, until losing to Joe Calzaghe via first-round stoppage in 2001, in a bid for the WBO super middleweight title. A fifteen-fight win streak followed, during which Veit won the European super middleweight title in 2003. Veit was granted a second chance at Calzaghe and his title in 2005, but was again stopped in six rounds. In 2006, Veit became the first to defeat Jürgen Brähmer. However, in the same year, a third loss for Veit came against Denis Inkin, who stopped him in seven rounds. Veit's final professional fight was a rematch against Brähmer in 2007, which ended in a fourth-round knockout victory for Bräehmer.

External links

 http://www.boxrec.com/media/index.php?title=Human:16148

1973 births
Living people
People from Lauchhammer
People from Bezirk Cottbus
German male boxers
Sportspeople from Brandenburg
Super-middleweight boxers